Jo-Issa Rae Diop (born January 12, 1985), credited professionally as Issa Rae, is an American actress, writer, producer, and comedian. Rae first garnered attention for her work on the YouTube web series Awkward Black Girl. Since 2011, Rae has continued to develop her YouTube channel, which features various short films, web series, and other content created by Black people.

Rae has achieved wider recognition as the co-creator, co-writer, and star of the HBO television series Insecure (2016–2021), for which she has been nominated for multiple Golden Globes Awards and Primetime Emmy Awards. Her 2015 memoir, titled The Misadventures of Awkward Black Girl, became a New York Times best-seller. In 2018 and 2022, Rae was included in the annual Time 100 list of the most influential people in the world.

Rae has also starred in feature films, with roles in the drama The Hate U Give (2018), the fantasy comedy Little (2019), the romance The Photograph (2020), the romantic comedy The Lovebirds (2020), and the comedy thriller Vengeance (2022). She will also voice Jessica Drew / Spider-Woman in Spider-Man: Across the Spider-Verse (2023). Rae provided the voice work for the short film Hair Love, which won the Academy Award for Best Animated Short Film in 2020.

Early life
Jo-Issa Rae Diop was born in Los Angeles, California. Her father, Abdoulaye Diop, is a pediatrician and neonatologist from Senegal, and her mother, Delyna Marie Diop (née Hayward), is a teacher from Louisiana. Her parents met in France, when they were both in school. She has four siblings. Her father has a medical practice in Inglewood, California.

The family lived in Dakar, Senegal, for a short period during her childhood. She was raised mostly in Potomac, Maryland, where she grew up with "things that aren't considered 'black,' like the swim team and street hockey and Passover dinners with Jewish best friends." When Rae was in sixth grade, her family moved to the affluent View Park-Windsor Hills neighborhood of Los Angeles, where she attended a predominantly black middle school. Rae graduated from King Drew Magnet High School of Medicine and Science, where she started acting. Her parents divorced when she was in high school. Rae is fluent in French.

In 2007, Rae graduated from Stanford University with a Bachelor of Arts in African and African-American Studies. As a college student, she made music videos, wrote and directed plays, and created a mock reality series called Dorm Diaries for fun. At Stanford, Rae met Tracy Oliver, who helped produce Awkward Black Girl and starred on the show as Nina.

After college, Rae received a theater fellowship at The Public Theater in New York City. Oliver and Rae started taking classes together at the New York Film Academy. Rae worked odd jobs and at one point was struggling to decide between business school and law school, but eventually abandoned both ideas when Awkward Black Girl started taking off in 2011.

Career

Awkward Black Girl

Rae's web series Awkward Black Girl premiered on YouTube in 2011. The show follows the life of J (played by Rae) as she interacts with co-workers and love interests who place her in uncomfortable situations. The story is told through a first-person narrative as J usually reveals how she feels about her circumstances through voice-over or dream sequence.

The series eventually went viral through word of mouth, blog posts, and social media, resulting in mainstream media coverage and attention. In an effort to fund the rest of the first season, Rae and producer Tracy Oliver decided to raise money for the series through Kickstarter. On August 11, 2011, they were awarded $56,269 from 1,960 donations and released the rest of season one on Rae's YouTube channel.

Rae eventually partnered with Pharrell and premiered season two of the series on his YouTube channel, iamOTHER. Rae also began releasing other content on her original channel, predominantly created by and starring people of color.

In 2013, Awkward Black Girl won a Shorty award for Best Web Show. Rae created Awkward Black Girl because she felt the Hollywood stereotypes of African-American women were limiting and she could not relate to them:

I've always had an issue with the [assumption] that people of color, and black people especially, aren't relatable. I know we are.

By using YouTube as her forum, Rae was able to have autonomy of her work because she writes, films, produces, and edits most of her work. Rae's other shows—Ratchet Piece Theater, The "F" Word, Roomieloverfriends, and The Choir, among others—also focus on African-American experiences that are often not portrayed in the mainstream media. Rae's YouTube series often imitate the production style of network television comedies, including "cut-away scenes" showing imagined behavior, similar to those seen in Scrubs and How I Met Your Mother.

Insecure

In 2013, Rae began working on a comedy series pilot with Larry Wilmore, in which she would star. The series, about the awkward experiences of a contemporary African-American woman, was eventually titled Insecure. HBO picked up the pilot in early 2015 and it was subsequently greenlit. Since its release in 2016, the series has received critical acclaim; Eric Deggans of NPR wrote that "Rae has produced a series that feels revolutionary just by poking fun at the life of an average, twenty-something black woman."

In 2017, the American Film Institute selected Insecure as one of the top 10 Television Programs of the Year. For her acting work on the show, Rae has received two Golden Globe Award nominations for Best Actress – Television Series Musical or Comedy in 2017 and 2018, as well as a Primetime Emmy Award nomination for Outstanding Lead Actress in a Comedy Series in 2018.

In 2018,  at the 77th annual Peabody Awards, Insecure was honored for "creating a series that authentically captures the lives of everyday young, black people in modern society."

On November 14, 2016, HBO renewed the show for a second season. The second season premiered on July 23, 2017. On August 8, 2017, it was announced that the show was renewed for a third season, which premiered on August 12, 2018. Season five premiered October 24, 2021. The final episode of Insecure aired December 26, 2021.

Film work
Released in 2020, The Photograph follows the journey of Issa's character, Mae Morton, and Lakeith Stanfield's character Michael Block, as the two search for the backstory of Mae's mother. The New York Times mentioned this film as “an unabashedly old-school love story”. The Empire said that "The Photograph is an African-American romance that, for the most part, feels relatable and true”.

Released in 2020, The Lovebirds directed by Michael Showalter, Rae played the role of Leilani. The film starred Kumail Nanjiani, who played Jibran, Leilani's boyfriend. Throughout the film, the couple struggles to maintain their relationship and during this, they face an eventful murder.

Book
Rae's first book, a memoir titled The Misadventures of Awkward Black Girl, was released in 2015 and became a New York Times best-seller. In the book, she chronicles her life through a series of humorous anecdotes and opens up about her personal struggle with not fitting in, and not being considered "black enough" at times.

Other work 
On October 11, 2019, Google announced that Rae would be an additional voice to the Google Assistant. Users could make Google Assistant speak in Rae's voice by saying "Ok Google, talk like Issa."  Issa's Voice was available until Friday, October 1, 2021.

Also in 2019, Rae, through her newly launched record label "Raedio," partnered with Atlantic Records to produce "Kinda Love" by singer-rapper TeaMarrr.

In March 2021, Rae's production company, Hoorae, signed a five-year film and television deal with WarnerMedia. In 2021, Sweet Life: Los Angeles, an reality television program created by Rae, was produced as part of this deal.

Personal life
Rae's birth name, Jo-Issa, comes from a combination of the names of her grandmothers: Joyce and Isseu. Her middle name, Rae, is after an aunt, who was an artist.

Rae married her longtime partner, Louis Diame, a Senegalese businessman, in a private ceremony in France in July 2021. Rae first wore her engagement ring publicly on the cover of Essence magazine's April 2019 issue.

Activism
Rae has used her platform to bring attention to police violence and brutality against African-Americans. Following the police shooting of Alton Sterling in 2016, she raised $700,000 for the Sterling Family Trust to help pay for the Sterling children to attend college.

Rae is an advocate for civil rights and women's rights movements. Her work includes themes of equality and social justice. She works closely with organizations like the ACLU, BLD PWR, and Black Lives Matter.

Her show Insecure has changed the public perception of the South Los Angeles community by highlighting Black businesses.

In the media
In 2012, Rae was included on the annual Forbes '30 Under 30''' list in the entertainment section.

In May 2015, Rae appeared on the cover of Essence'' magazine's Game Changers issue, alongside Shonda Rhimes, Ava DuVernay, Debbie Allen, and Mara Brock Akil. Rae expressed her desire for more people of color working in production behind the scenes to make a lasting impact in the television industry.

On the red carpet at the 2017 Emmy Awards, Rae told reporters, "I'm rooting for everybody Black." The quote went viral and appeared on T-shirts and in the song "Sue Me" by the rapper Wale.

Filmography

Film

Television

Music videos

Awards and nominations

Works and publications

References

External links

 
 
 
 
 Issa Rae on Instagram

1985 births
21st-century American actresses
Actresses from Los Angeles
Actresses from Maryland
African-American actresses
African-American screenwriters
American people of Senegalese descent
Screenwriters from California
African-American women writers
American women screenwriters
American YouTubers
Living people
People from Potomac, Maryland
People from View Park–Windsor Hills, California
Stanford University alumni
Web series directors
Web series producers
Writers from Los Angeles
Screenwriters from Maryland
American women television writers
American television writers
21st-century American screenwriters
African-American female comedians
American women comedians
21st-century African-American women
20th-century African-American people
20th-century African-American women